Henry Strachey may refer to:
 Henry Strachey (artist) (1863–1940), English painter and art critic
 Henry Strachey (explorer) (1816–1912), British explorer and army officer
 Sir Henry Strachey, 1st Baronet (1736–1810), British politician
 Sir Henry Strachey, 2nd Baronet (1772–1858), son of the above, of Sutton Court